Kiryat Eliezer may refer to:

Kiryat Eliezer, Netanya, a neighborhood in Israel
Kiryat Eliezer Stadium in Haifa, Israel
Kiryat Eliezer, Haifa